Alfosina is a feminine given name. It is the feminine counterpart of the masculine name Alfonso, which in turn is the Latin form of Alphons.

Persons
Alfonsina Orsini (1472-1520), Regent of Florence
Alfonsina Strada (1891-1959), Italian cyclist
Alfonsina Storni (1892-1938), Argentine poet
Alfonsina Maldonado (born 1984), Uruguayan agricultural technician, equestrian and lecturer

See also 
 
 Alfonsina (disambiguation)
 Alphons

Feminine given names